Chrysanthos Sisinis (born 1857 in Gastouni) was a Greek Army general.

He studied at the Hellenic Army Academy, graduating in 1881 as an Engineers Second Lieutenant. He fought in the Greco-Turkish War of 1897, and the Balkan Wars of 1912–13. He finally retired from service on 24 January 1915 (O.S.) with the rank of Major General.

References

1857 births
20th-century deaths
Year of death missing
People from Gastouni
Hellenic Army major generals
Greek military personnel of the Balkan Wars
Greek military personnel of the Greco-Turkish War (1897)
Chrysanthos